Yapto Soelistyo Soerjosoemarno is an Indonesian politician who is known as the leader of Pancasila Youth, an organization of quasi-official political gangsters that supported the New Order military dictatorship of Soeharto, while also engaging in other lucrative but non-official criminal acts. Pancasila Youth played an important role in supporting Soeharto's military coup in 1965: they ran death squads for the Indonesian army, murdering thousands of alleged communists across the province of North Sumatra.

Early life
He was born 16 December 1949, in Surakarta, Central Java. His father, Ir. KPN. Soetarjo Soerjosoemarno, is a member of the Mangkunegaran Javanese nobility. Soerjosoemarno is also an expert in topography and geodesy who finished his education at the Delft University of Technology in the Netherlands. His mother, Dolly Zegerius, who was of Jewish Dutch origin was a competitive contract bridge player, and a naturalised Indonesian citizen

Career
Yapto Soerjosoemarno is known as the leader of Pancasila Youth, an organization of semi-official political gangsters that supported the New Order military dictatorship of Soeharto. Pancasila Youth played an important role in supporting Soeharto's military coup in 1965: they ran death squads for the Indonesian army, murdering thousands of alleged communists and Chinese Indonesians across the province of North Sumatra.  The leaders of these death squads, Effendy Nasution, Jan Pahrum Lubis, Roshiman and others selected Yapto to lead Pancasila Youth in 1980. In addition to leading Pancasila Youth, Yapto today leads a political party formally affiliated with Pancasila Youth called the Patriot Party. The Patriot Party is known for its loyalty to the family of former Indonesian President, the late General Suharto. He is also a lawyer and owns a law firm in South Jakarta, Indonesia.

Yapto also heads other 'youth gangs'.

On 12 March 2011, Yapto received a bomb disguised as a book named Apakah Masih Ada Pancasila (Does the Pancasila still exist?).

Yapto featured in the award-winning 2012 documentary The Act of Killing, in which he is shown as a wealthy and misogynistic he-man. He has threatened to sue the film's director or producers.

Personal life
Yapto married Retno Suciati and has three children: Golda Nayawitri B.D.K, Sahid Abishalom B.N.N.S, and Jedidiah Shenazar K.S. The Soerjosoemarno family includes several performers: Yapto's elder sister Marini is an actress, and his niece Shelomita (Marini's daughter) is a singer. Both he and his family have had frequent brushes with the law and have been detained.

References

1949 births
Living people
People from Surakarta
Indonesian Muslims
Indonesian anti-communists
20th-century Indonesian lawyers
Indonesian people of Dutch descent
Indonesian people of Dutch-Jewish descent
Indo people
Patriot Party (Indonesia) politicians